Wang Yaoqing is a Taiwanese actor.

Wang Yaoqing may also refer to:

 Wang Yaoqing (Peking opera), Peking opera performer